Below is a list of Coptic place names for places in Egypt and the Middle East. Names marked with "Gr." denominate Coptic place names derived from Greek.

Cairo Governorate

Giza Governorate

Beheira Governorate

Qalyubia Governorate 
Shubra el-Kheima – ϫⲉⲫⲣⲟ ϩⲃⲱ (Jephro Hwo), "hamlet of covering, garment" 
Benha – ⲡⲁⲛⲁϩⲟ (Banaho), "house of sycamore" 
Marsafa – *ⲙⲉⲣϫⲱⲡⲓ (Merjobi), "temple pool, lake" 
Sindibis – *ϯⲥⲉⲃⲉⲛⲥⲏ (Disebensi), "place of burnt offerings" 
Sanafir – *ⲥⲉⲛⲛⲟⲩϥⲣⲓ (Senufri), "place of good, profit" 
Nub Taha – *ⲛⲟⲩⲃ ⲧⲟⲩϩⲟ (Nub Tuho), "settlement of gold" 
Nawa – *ⲛⲁⲩⲓ (Nawi), "bundle of flax" 
Shiblangah – ϫⲉⲃⲣⲟⲛ̀ⲛⲉϫⲓ (Jebroenneji), "settlement of subjects" 
Tisfa – *ϯⲥⲉⲡⲓ (Tisepi), "district, abode of district’s administration or flood waters ’bank, bank of a river" 
Qaha – *ⲕⲁϩⲓ (Kahi), "area, district, soil" 
Biltan – *ⲡⲉⲗⲧⲏⲛⲉ (Beltane), "anti-flood dam" 
Isnit – *ⲥⲁⲛⲓⲱⲧ (Saniot), "oats-seller" 
Imyay – *ⲁⲙⲁⲩⲉⲓ (Amayey), "shepherd of cattle, sheep herds" 
Tuh – *ⲧⲱϧⲓ (Towkh), "flood waters" 
Sandanhur – *ⲥⲉⲛϯⲛϩⲱⲣ (Sendinhor), "foundation of Horus" 
Ikyad Digwa – *ⲁⲕⲏⲧⲱ ϯⲕⲉⲃⲓ (Akido Dikewi) 
Sinhira – *ⲥⲉⲛϩⲓⲣⲏ (Senhira), "place of the Highest God" 
Kalama – *ⲕⲉⲗⲉⲙⲁ (Kelema), "chapel of Sun God" 
Bahtim – *ⲡⲉϩⲟⲓⲧⲏⲧ (Behoitit) "(house, temple of the Shining (Hathor)" 
Bigam – *ⲡⲉϫⲁⲙ (Bejam), "house, temple of Hathor" 
Namul –* ⲛⲁⲙⲟⲩⲛ (Namun), "belonging to Amun" 
Barkata – *ⲡⲉⲣⲁⲕⲧⲱ (Berakto), "house, temple of the Creator (Khnum)" 
Atrib – ⲁⲑⲣⲏⲃⲓ (Atrhebi),

Sharqiya Governorate 
Farsis – ⲡⲉⲣⲥⲓⲥ (Persis),

Alexandria Governorate
 Alexandria – ⲁⲗⲉⲝⲁⲛⲇⲣⲓⲁ (Gr.), ⲣⲁⲕⲟϯ (Alexandria, Rakodi)

Monufia Governorate

 Menouf – ⲡⲁⲛⲟⲩϥⲓ ⲣⲏⲥ (Panufi Res)

Gharbia Governorate 
 Tanta – ⲧⲁⲛⲧⲁⲑⲟ (Tantato) 
 Zefta – ⲍⲉⲃⲉⲑⲉ (Zewete) 
 Lake Burullus – ⲗⲓⲙⲛⲏ ⲛⲓⲕⲉϫⲱⲟⲩ (Limne Nikedjow) 
 El–Mahalla El–Kubra – ϯϣⲁⲓⲣⲓ (Dishairi), "the residence" 
 Difra – ϯⲫⲣⲉ (Tifre)

Damietta Governorate 
 Damietta – ⲧⲁⲙⲓⲁϯ (Damiadi), "port"

Kafr el-Sheikh Governorate 
 Fuwa – ⲃⲟⲩⲁ (Boua)

Sinai
 Sinai – ⲥⲓⲛⲁ (Sina) 
 Mount Sinai – ⲧⲟⲟⲩ ⲥⲓⲛⲁ (Toou Sina) 
Arish – ϩⲣⲓⲛⲟⲕⲟⲣⲟⲩⲣⲁ (Hrinokorura) (Gr.) 
 Farama – ⲡⲉⲣⲉⲙⲟⲩⲛ (Beremun), "house of Amun" 
 Sheikh Zuweid – ⲃⲁⲓⲧⲩⲗⲟⲩⲁ (Waitulua) 
 Mahammediya –  ⲅⲉⲣⲁⲥ (Geras) (Gr.) 
 El-Qeis –  ⲕⲁⲥⲓⲟⲥ (Kasios) (Gr.) 
 Red Sea – ⲫⲓⲟⲙ ⲛ̀ϩⲁϩ (Fiom Enhah)

Beni Suef Governorate
 Mallawi – ⲙⲁⲛⲗⲁⲩ (Manlau), "place of textile"

Fayyum Governorate 
 Faiyum – ⲫⲓⲟⲙ (Phiom), "the sea, lake" 
Sanhur –  ⲥⲩⲛϩⲱⲣ (Synhor), "the residence of Horus" 
Sinnuris – ⲯⲓⲛⲟⲩⲣⲉⲥ (Psinures) (Gr.) 
Ibshaway – ⲡⲓϣⲁⲉⲓ (Bishaei) 
Abu Girg –  ⲡⲉⲕⲉⲣⲕⲏ (Bekerke), "temple, house of Horus" 
Tamiyah – ⲧⲁⲙⲁⲟⲩⲓⲥ (Tamauis) (Gr.) 
Hawarra – ϩⲟⲩⲱⲣ (Howor), "great house" 
 Lahun – ⲗⲉϩⲱⲛⲉ (Lehone), "the mouth, door"

Minya Governorate 
 Minya – ⲧⲙⲱⲛⲏ (Tmone)

Asyut Governorate
 Asyut – ⲥⲓⲱⲟⲩⲧ (Siowt), 
 Kharga – ϩⲏⲃ (Hib) 
 Abutig –  ⲁⲡⲟⲩⲑⲏⲕ (Abutek), "storehouse" 
 Abnub – ⲡⲁⲛⲟⲩⲃ (Banub), "house, temple of gold" 
 Manfalut – ⲙⲁⲛⲃⲁⲗⲟⲧ (Manwalot), "place of leather clothing"

Sohag Governorate
 Akhmim – ⲭⲙⲓⲛ, ϣⲙⲓⲛ (Khmin, Shmin), "the abode of Min" 
 Abydos – ⲉⲃⲱⲧ (Ebot) 
 Girga – ϭⲉⲣϭⲉ, ⲧⲓⲛ (Cherche, Tin), "the Horus" 
 Wannina –  ⲁⲧⲣⲓⲡⲉ (Atribe), "palace, temple of Repyt"

Luxor Governorate 
 Luxor – ⲛⲏ (Ne) 
 Esne – ⲥⲛⲏ (Sne)

Qena Governorate 
 Qena – ⲕⲱⲛⲏ (Kone) 
 Dendera –  ⲧⲉⲛⲧⲱⲣⲓ, ⲛⲓⲧⲉⲛⲧⲱⲣⲓ (Dendori, Nidendori), "the goddess"

Aswan Governorate 
 Aswan – ⲥⲟⲩⲁⲛ (Suan), "place of trade" 
Elephantine –  ⲓⲏⲃ (Ieb) 
 Philae –  ⲡⲓⲗⲁⲕ (Pilak) 
 Edfu – ⲉⲧⲃⲟ (Etwo) 
 Kom Ombo – ⲙⲃⲱ (Mbo) 
 Qasr Ibrim – ⲡⲣⲓⲙ (Brim)

Outside of Egypt
 Jerusalem – ϩⲓⲉⲣⲟⲩⲥⲁⲗⲏⲙ (Hierusalim) 
 Rome – ϩⲣⲱⲙⲏ (Hroma) 
 Damascus – Ⲇ ⲁⲙⲁⲥⲕⲟⲥ (Damaskos) 
 Gilan –  ⲕⲓⲗⲁⲛ (Kilan) 
 Hamadan –  ⲁⲙⲁϩⲁⲑⲁⲛ (Amahatan) 
 Shusha –  ⲥⲟⲩⲥⲱⲛ (Souson) 
 Khuzestan – ⲟⲍⲉⲟⲥ (Ozeos) 
 Tigris – ϯⲅⲣⲓⲥ, ⲡⲛⲁϭ ⲛ̀ⲓⲉⲣⲟ (Tigris, Bnach Eniero)

Countries 
 Israel – ⲡⲓⲥⲣⲁⲏⲗ (Bisrael) 
 Greece – ϯⲉⲗⲗⲁⲥ (Hellas) 
 Cyprus – ⲕⲩⲡⲣⲟⲥ (Kubros) 
 Ethiopia – ⲉⲑⲱϣ (Etosh) 
 Libya – ϯⲗⲩⲃⲏ, ⲗⲏⲃⲓ (ti-Luwi, Liwi) 
 Syria – ϯⲥⲩⲣⲓⲁ (ti-Suria) 
 India –  ϩⲉⲛⲧⲟⲩ (Hendou), ⲑⲉⲛⲧⲓⲕⲏ

References 

 Trismegistos Geo (http://www.trismegistos.org/geo/index.php)"
 Claremont Coptic Encyclopedia". Claremont Colleges Digital Library. Claremont Colleges. Retrieved 10 January 2016
 Emile Amélineau. La géographie de l’Egypte à l'époque copte. — Paris: Imprimerie nationale, 1893. — 690 p.
 Henricus Tattam, S.T.P.. Prophetae Majores in dialecto linguae Aegyptiacae Memphitica seu Coptica. — Oxford, 1852
 A Coptic Palimpsest Containing Joshua, Judges, Ruth, Judith and Esther In The Sahidic Dialect, Edited By Sir Herbert Thompson. — Oxford, 1911.
 Werner Vycichl. Dictionnaire étymologique de la langue copte. — Louvain, 1983.

Coptic
Coptic language